Torralba del Moral is a village under the local government of the municipality of Medinaceli, Soria, Spain. It has a railway station and a junction where the branch to Soria splits from the Madrid-Zaragoza line.

References

Populated places in the Province of Soria